The Lego Movie 2 Videogame is a Lego-themed action-adventure video game developed by Traveller's Tales and published by Warner Bros. Interactive Entertainment. Based on the 2019 film of the same name, it is a direct stand-alone sequel and the second installment to The Lego Movie Videogame, released on February 26, 2019, for the Nintendo Switch, PlayStation 4, Windows, and Xbox One; and on March 14, 2019, it was released for macOS. It is the last Lego Movie video game to be published by Warner Bros. Interactive Entertainment before Warner Bros. sold the rights to The Lego Movie franchise to Universal Pictures in 2020.

Gameplay
The game borrows from Lego Worlds and Lego Dimensions, and has new additional characters and refined combat mechanics, as well as those from the first game. Worlds and characters from both films are featured in the game. Players create various structures in order to access new levels.

The first DLC expansion was titled the "Prophecy Pack," and brought prominent characters from the first movie into the game, such as Young Vitruvius and Lord Business. Additionally, "Galactic Adventures" DLC expansion pack was made available on April 18, 2019, featuring three levels that expand further on certain plot moments from the film, such as Future Emmet's rise to becoming Rex Dangervest and Mayhem helping out the members of the Justice League.

Development and release

It was officially announced on November 27, 2018, that The Lego Movie Videogame would be getting a sequel, just like The Lego Movie. Upon its announcement, Sean William McEvoy, the vice president of digital applications and games at the Lego Group, emphasized the open-world aspect of the game.

The game was released worldwide on February 26, 2019, two weeks after the release of The Lego Movie 2: The Second Part, for the PlayStation 4, Xbox One, Nintendo Switch, and Microsoft Windows.

Reception 

On Metacritic, the Nintendo Switch version of The Lego Movie 2 Videogame has a score of 56 out of 100 points, based on 9 reviews, while the PlayStation 4 version received a score of 57 out of 100 points based on 23 reviews.
Steam (service) reviewers gave the game an average score of 7 out of 10.

Andrew Reiner of Game Informer gave the game a six out of ten, saying that "The Lego Movie 2 Videogame rarely pushes the player to do anything other than go into their building menu to select one object, and ends up being a shockingly bland experience in a series that has been mostly consistent in doing fun things with different properties." Similarly, Metro gave the game a 3 out 10, justifying their score by saying that the game was a "cheap and nasty film tie-in that reaches a new low for Lego games and stands in stark contrast to the creativity of the movie and the toys."

David Chapman for Common Sense Media gave the game a five out of five star rating and commented, "If you've played Lego Worlds before, you'll instantly recognize the new elements in The Lego Movie 2 Videogame. Players use a scanner to add Lego pieces and structures to their inventory, using studs collected through gameplay to unlock scanned items for use. It can take a little extra time to learn how to use the new tools and to navigate the build system, but it's not too complicated and winds up being a lot of fun. Along the way, there are characters scattered around with requests for players to complete. These missions range from simple collection quests to huge boss battles. The story moves along with cinematic cutscenes as players travel through the Systar System to other worlds. What makes this interesting is how the creative freedom and story elements still manage to fit together to give kids the chance to relive the events of the movie and to have their own unique experience at the same time. Instead of simply watching the story unfold, The Lego Movie 2 Videogame lets kids tap into their imagination as a part of the story and feel like a true Master Builder in the process."

Notes

See also
 Lego Dimensions
 The Lego Ninjago Movie Video Game

References

External links
 

2019 video games
Lego video games
The Lego Movie (franchise) video games
Video game sequels
Nintendo Switch games
PlayStation 4 games
Video games developed in the United Kingdom
Xbox One games
Windows games
Dystopian video games
Video games based on films
Post-apocalyptic video games
3D platform games
Video games scored by Simon Withenshaw
Crossover video games
Feral Interactive games
Multiplayer and single-player video games